Raman Maroo is an Indian film producer. He is the Managing Director of Shemaroo Entertainment.

Filmography
 Ishqiya - 2010

References

Film producers from Mumbai
Living people
Year of birth missing (living people)